Juan d'Espinar (died 1601) was a Roman Catholic bishop who served as Prelate of Santa Lucia del Mela (1590–1601).

Biography
In 1590, Juan d'Espinar was appointed by Pope Sixtus V as Bishop of the Territorial Prelature of Santa Lucia del Mela. He served as Prelate of Santa Lucia del Mela until his death in 1601.

References

External links and additional sources
 (for Chronology of Bishops) 
 (for Chronology of Bishops) 

1601 deaths
16th-century Roman Catholic bishops in Sicily
Bishops appointed by Pope Sixtus V